"Bring the Pain" is a song recorded by the rap artist Method Man. It is the first single released from his debut album Tical.

Comedian Chris Rock named his 1996 tour and television special "Bring the Pain" after this song. Method Man is credited in the special's closing credits. The song was also featured in the 2002 film 8 Mile.

Industrial music band Mindless Self Indulgence covered it on their 1999 album, Tight, as did Candiria on their album The COMA Imprint.
The beat was sampled by Timbaland for a song of the same name on Missy Elliott's Under Construction, which features Method Man. Tupac Shakur did an Interpolation of the song on his 1996 album All Eyez on Me on the track No More Pain, and even gave Method Man and RZA credits in the album's liner notes.

The Chemical Brothers' remix was included in Pitchfork Media's 2010 list of "twenty-five great remixes" of the 1990s.

Music video
The music video was released for the week ending on October 23, 1994.

Charts

References

1994 singles
Method Man songs
Music videos directed by Diane Martel
Song recordings produced by RZA
Def Jam Recordings singles
Songs written by Method Man
1994 songs
Songs written by RZA
Hardcore hip hop songs
Songs written by Chuck D
Songs written by Gary G-Wiz
Songs written by Hank Shocklee